Eurytoma is a genus of parasitoid chalcid wasps in the family Eurytomidae. There are at least 620 described species in Eurytoma.

See also
 List of Eurytoma species

References

Further reading

 
 
 

Parasitic wasps
Eurytomidae